Matías González may refer to:

 Matías González (football manager), Argentine football manager
 Matías González (footballer, born 1925), Uruguayan defender
 Matías González (footballer, born 1990), Argentine forward
 Matías González (footballer, born 1992), Uruguayan defender
 Matías González (footballer, born 1993), Uruguayan defender
 Matías González (footballer, born 1994), Argentine defender
 Matías González (footballer, born 1997), Argentine forward
 Matías González (footballer, born 1999), Argentine forward